Yaroslava Shvedova was the defending champion, but lost in the first round to Akgul Amanmuradova.

Serena Williams defeated Patty Schnyder 7–5, 6–3 in the final to win her title.

Singles results

Seeds

Finals

Top half

Bottom half

Qualifying

Seeds

  Ayumi Morita (first round)
  Katie O'Brien (moved to main draw)
  Monica Niculescu (qualified)
  Andreja Klepač (first round)
  Mathilde Johansson (qualifying competition)
  Emmanuelle Gagliardi (first round)
  Anne Keothavong (qualifying competition)
  Vesna Manasieva (first round)
  Angelika Bachmann (qualified)

Qualifiers

Draw

First qualifier

Second qualifier

Third qualifier

Fourth qualifier

References

2008 WTA Tour
Bangalore Open